Kryvyi Rih, also known as Krivoy Rog, is a city in central Ukraine. It hosts the administration of the Kryvyi Rih District and its subordinate Kryvyi Rih urban community. The city is also part of the Kryvyi Rih Metropolitan Region. Its population is estimated at  making it the seventh-most populous city in Ukraine and the second largest by area. Kryvyi Rih is also claimed to be the longest city in Europe.

Located at the confluence of the Saksahan and Inhulets rivers, Kryvyi Rih was founded as a military staging post in 1775. Urban-industrial growth followed Belgian, French and British investment in the exploitation of the area's rich iron-ore deposits (generally called Kryvbas) in the 1880s. Kryvyi Rih gained city status after the October Revolution in 1919.

Stalin-era industrialisation saw the development in the city from 1934 of Kryvorizhstal, the largest integrated metallurgical works in the Soviet Union. After a brutal German occupation in World War II, Kryvyi Rih experienced renewed growth through to the 1970s. The economic dislocation associated with the break-up of the Soviet Union contributed to high unemployment and a large-scale exodus from the city in the 1990s. The privatization of Kryvorizhstal in 2005 was followed by increased foreign and private investment which helped finance urban regeneration. Beginning in 2017, there were major labour protests and strikes.

In their February 2022 invasion of Ukraine, forces of the Russian Federation approached the city's outskirts from Russian-occupied Crimea. In March, their advance stalled some 50 km to the south. The city has since been a target of frequent missile strikes.

Etymology
Kryvyi Rih, which in Ukrainian literally means "Crooked Horn" or "Curved Cape", was the name originally given in the 18th century to the general area of the present city by Zaporozhian Cossacks. According to local legend, the first village in the area was founded by a "crooked" (Ukrainian slang for "one-eyed") Cossack named Rih ("Horn"), but the name likely derives from the shape of the landmass formed by the confluence of the river Saksahan with the Inhulets.

History

Early history

In 1734 the Cossack Zaporizhian Sich (or Host) incorporated the area within the Inhul Palanka division of their de-facto republic. A list of villages and winter camps (zymivnyki) from that time mentions Kryvyi Rih. In 1770, Kryvyi Rih was again recorded as the camp of Zaporizhian Sich.

On May 8, 1775, after the end of the Russian-Turkish War, Russian authorities established Kryvyi Rih as a staging post (in the tradition of the Mongol yam) on the roads to the Russian garrisons of Kremenchuk, Kinburn foreland and Ochakov. In August of that year, on the direct order of Catherine the Great, the Sich was forcibly dissolved. The cossack lands were annexed to the Russian province of Novorossiya and distributed among the Russian and Ukrainian gentry.

The early 19th century saw the construction of the first stone houses (1828), and three water mills. In 1860 the village was designated a township.

Industrial growth
Alexander Pol (also known as Paul), discovered and initiated iron ore investigation and production in this area. He is credited with discovering the Kryvbas. This stimulated formation of a mining district. In 1884 Alexander II initiated the Catherine Railroad, first to Dnipro and then 505 km to the coal-mining region of Donbas.

In 1880, with 5 million francs of capital, Pol founded the "French Society of Kryvyi Rih Ores". In 1882 16.4 thousand tons of ore were extracted from surface mines on the outskirts of town by 150 workers. The first underground mine of the basin began operations in 1886. In 1892, when Hdantsivka ironworks was started, ore began to be processed locally, spawning new metallurgical enterprises spurred by substantial western, and in particular Belgian, investment. At the same time Kryvyi Rih ore began to feed the German metallurgical industry in Silesia. In 1902, the Catherine Railroad linked Kryvyi Rih to the coal mines of the Donbas.

At the end of the 19th century the tallest building was the Central Synagogue, built by a thriving Jewish community of artisans, merchants and traders. In 1905 the community was subject to pogroms in which the authorities were complicit. Many Jewish people left the area, emigrating to Germany, Austria-Hungary and the United States.

The surrounding mines attracted prospectors looking to turn a quick profit. The supply of mined ore soon exceeded demand. Many mines had to cut employment or temporarily suspend operations. Workers, many drawn from the Russian-speaking north (from Great Russia), laboured in harsh conditions with no security. Work in the mines induced lung cancer, tuberculosis and asthma. In protest, workers began to develop ideas about socialism and democracy. Labour unrest resulted in several terrorist attacks and in widespread strikes.

The First World War interrupted access to the export markets, and many workers were drafted into the military. A council of soviet of Soldiers and Worker's Deputies was formed in 1917. January 1918 saw the first attempt by the Bolsheviks to establish the authority in the town of the new Soviet government in Moscow.

Russian Civil War 
In the civil war that followed the Bolshevik Revolution of October 1917, Kryvyi Rih changed hands several times. In February 1918, the Bolsheviks proclaimed the Donetsk-Krivoy Rog Soviet Republic, but then in March conceded the territory under the terms of the Treaty of Brest-Litovsk to the German-controlled Ukrainian State. After the Germans and their Austro-Hungarian allies withdrew in November 1918, the town was successively occupied by the nationalists of the Ukrainian People's Republic, the counter-revolutionary Volunteer Army of General Denikin (the "Whites"),  the anarchist Revolutionary Insurgent Army of Ukraine (the Makhnovshchina) and, from 17 January 1920, by the Bolshevik Red Army. In 1922 the region was incorporated into the Ukrainian SSR, a constituent republic of the Soviet Union.

Soviet era

Industrialisation and collectivisation 
The town, with a population of  22,571, was now designated a city. Mine operations were revived, and in 1924 a 55.3 km (34.4 mi) water-supply system was laid underground. In the summer of 1927, 10,000 people began to work on the Dnieprostroi, a huge dam on the Dnieper River in Zaporizhzhia, whose hydro-electric power was to drive Kryvyi Rih's industrialisation. The first Mining Institute opened in 1929. The Medical and Pedagogical Institutes were founded.

In line with Stalin's plans for break-neck industrialisation, in 1931 the foundation of the Kryvyi Rih Metallurgical Plant, the future Kryvorizhstal, was laid. The first blast furnace of the metallurgical works produced steel three years later. The city grew rapidly. In the surrounding countryside, industrialisation was accompanied the collectivisation of agriculture. The dispossession of the peasants and the confiscation of their harvests induced the Holodomor or Great Famine of 1932–33.

By 1941, at over 200,000, the population of the industrial city had increased almost tenfold.

Nazi occupation
During World War II, Kryvyi Rih was occupied by the German Army from 15 August 1941 to 22 February 1944, and was administered for most of that period as part of the Reichskommissariat Ukraine. In advance of the Germans, industrial plant and machine operators were evacuated to Nizhny Tagil in the Urals. An initial toleration of Ukrainian cultural activity and propaganda by the pro-German Organization of Ukrainian Nationalists in the town ended in January and February 1942 with the arrest and execution of the leading Ukrainian activists.

In 1939 12,745 Jews had lived in Krivoy Rog, comprising about 6 per cent of the total population. Those who did not succeed in leaving the city during the organized evacuation were systematically concentrated and murdered by the Nazi occupiers. The first mass killing of two to three hundred by an Einsatzkommando occurred at the end of August 1941 at a brick works. On 14–15 October a combination of SS, German police and Ukrainian auxiliaries murdered 7,000 more at an iron ore mine. Children were thrown into the pits alive.

Hitler had repeatedly stressed the crucial importance of this area: "The Nikopol manganese is of such importance, it cannot be expressed in words. Loss of Nikopol (on the Dnieper River, southwest of Zaporozhye) would mean the end of war."  The German bridgehead on the left bank of the Dnieper gave the German command a base in order to restore the land connection with their forces locked in the Crimea. During the first half of January 1944, Soviet troops made repeated attempts to eliminate the Nikopol-Krivoy Rog enemy group, but the Nikopol–Krivoy Rog Offensive did not succeed in breaking into the city until the end of February. Although the greater part of city was destroyed, a special 37th Red Army detachment prevented the German demolition of the power stations in the city and the Saksahan dams.

Post-war 
After the war, people lived among the ruins while rebuilding the housing stock. The housing shortage was met by innovative technological solutions, and temporary barracks and houses were quickly built.

In the late 1940s, re-construction was accompanied by Stakhanovite propaganda: Pre-war iron ore production was restored by 1950. In 1961 this was supplemented by new mines and by the Central and, Northern Iron Ore Enrichment Works. By the end of the Soviet era Kryvbas was producing 42% of USSR and 80% of Ukrainian ore.

At the beginning of the 1960s, the city received a signature 185m-tall, guyed tubular steel TV mast. It also saw housing stock replaced and expanded with several large Khrushchyovkas apartment complexes, and urban planning incorporating broad tree-lined avenues with trams lines running down their center.

On June 16–18, 1963, increased food prices triggered protests in the city, estimated to involve between 1,000 and 6,000 people. After an ex-serviceman who had interceded with the police was severely beaten, there was rioting. Moscow sent in troops. While the authorities admitted to 4 dead and 15 wounded, witnesses report that soldiers killed at least 7, and that over 200 people were hospitalised with injuries. Fifteen hundred people received prison sentences.

In 1975, the city's two-hundredth anniversary was marked by the development of the Jubilee mine and adjacent residential area, and by the construction of a new city administration building and park. In September 1976 Krivorozh wool spinning factory was commissioned.

In last years of the Soviet Union, and following a sharp reduction in spending on cultural, sports and youth service, the city witnessed neighborhood-based.gang violence—the so-called "war of Runners". The era of Perestrioka was also marked by the emergence of independent trade unions, and of new civic and political organisations.

The former Krivoi Rog Air Base is located nearby.

In independent Ukraine

Redevelopment and politics 
In a national referendum on 1 December 1991, Ukrainian independence was approved by 90% of the votes cast in Kryvyi Rih's Dnipropetrovsk Oblast. The first 25 years of independence was a period of economic dislocation and adjustment. The population of the city decreased by almost 100,000 from a peak of 780,000 in the late 1980s.

Assisted by Metinvest, investment followed the 2005 privatization of Kryvorizhstal, and there was extensive redevelopment including new shopping and entertainment centers. In July 2020 as part of the administrative reform of Ukraine, Kryvyi Rih Municipality and the Kryvyi Rih Raion came under a common city authority.  The city remains the second most important in the Dnipropetrovsk region after Dnipro. Krivyi Rih has two independent universities, and several institutes and technical schools.

Until the events of Euromaidan in 2014 and their aftermath, in local and national elections Kryvyi Rih favored Russian-friendly candidates belonging first, in the 1990s, to the Communist Party of Ukraine and then, in the new century, the Party of Regions. In 2010 the city elected Party of Regions Yuriy Vilkul mayor, and helped Viktor Yanukovych to victory in the presidential election. After the Euromaidan events, which were accompanied by demonstrations and clashes in the city centre, support began to ebb from the Party of Regions. Petro Poroshenko, who insisted that Russian separatists in the Donbas "don't represent anybody", was supported in the presidential election of 2014. Vilkul was re-elected mayor in 2015, but amidst large-scale protests alleging electoral fraud.

In the 2019 Ukrainian presidential election the city supported its native son Volodymyr Zelenskyy, who defeated Poroshenko in the second round in April.  In the July 2019 elections for the Ukrainian Rada, candidates for Zelenskyy's Servant of the People Party won the city's three parliamentary seats. However, in December 2020, the Servant of the People candidate for mayor, Dmytr Shevchuk, lost to Kostantin Pavlov of the pro-Russian Opposition Platform — For Life.

On 15 August 2021, Pavlov was found dead in the entrance to his home, a gun lying next to his body. In September, reporting on an investigation that included a search of the home of the former, and now acting, mayor, Yyriy Vilkul, the Minister of Internal Affairs Denys Monastyrsky suggested that Pavlov may have committed suicide against the backdrop of a large-scale audit of the city's budget.

Labour protests 
Beginning in 2017 Kryvyi Rih witnessed major labour unrest. In May 2017, coordinated protest actions began at the city's main plants, Kryvyi Rih Iron Ore Plant, Evraz-Sukha Balka and AMKR. Employees stopped work, held public meetings and occupied administration offices. Conscious that they were receiving one of the lowest wages across the global industry, the metalworkers raised the demand for a monthly wage of US$1,000/Euros. The conflict stopped after an agreement was reached to gradually raise wages (on average by 50%). But the following year, protest erupted again triggered by the fatal result of underinvestment in plant and safety. On the night of 3–4 March 2018, the roof collapsed at AMKR's converter shop, killing a 25-year-old worker.

In May, the ArcelorMittal steel plant ground to a halt as workers refused to guide trains along the factory's self-enclosed supply chain until they received monthly pay of 1,000 euros. Management brought in employees from state-owned railway company Ukrzaliznytsia to run the factory, breaking the strike but leaving the central dispute in place. An underlying problem, according to ArcelorMittal's chief procurement officer, is a labour shortage. Skilled workers are emigrating to Poland, Czechia, and to other countries. But the plant's upper management sees costs associated with the higher salaries that might retain workers as an unacceptable threat to an ambitious, multibillion-dollar factory modernization project.

Kryvorizhstal, Ukraine's largest integrated steel company, had been privatised in 2005 in publicly televised auction. This was after the incoming government of President Viktor Yushchenko cancelled a 2004 auction that had seen the company sold at a much lower price to a consortium that included the son-in-law of ex-President Leonid Kuchma.The Indian-owned international steel conglomerate Mittal Steel proved successful with a bid of $4.8 billion (equivalent to a fifth of Ukraine's national budget). In 2006, Mittal took over its international rival, Arcelor, to form ArcelorMittal headquartered in Luxembourg City. Since then the company says its has invested more than $5 billion in its Kryvyi Rih operations.

On 15 October 2020, in an action that began with 393 miners occupying mine-shafts, 18 iron-ore miners came to the surface after spending a total of 43 days underground to protest pay and conditions. The mine administration had introduced piecework wages for most jobs underground, linking people's daily income to the amount of ore mined. In response to this, and to above-ground worker blockades, plant management made concessions on wages, benefits and health and safety.

2022 Russian invasion 

On the first day of the invasion of Ukraine by Russia, 24 February 2022, there were air strikes against military targets in the city, causing evacuations of residents in the district of Makulan.

On 27 February, city mayor Oleksandr Vilkul was appointed the head of the military administration of Kryvyi Rih. According to Vilkul, the day previously — the second day the war — the Russian military had attempted an air assault. An Ilyushin Il 76 transport had approached an abandoned Soviet-era air base just east of the city. Carrying more than 100 paratroopers with orders to capture the airfield as an “air bridge”, it was forced to abort its mission at 300 metres. As soon as the city had been hit with missiles local defenders had blocked the runway with mechanical equipment. On the same day, Vilkul said that he had received a phone call from a former colleague who invited him to "sign an agreement of friendship, cooperation and defense with Russia"; he said that he "responded with profanity."

On the third day of the war, 27 February, the Russian forces, according to Vilkul, sent a column of 300 military vehicles from their advancing position to the south, and that after ten days of intense fighting they were turned back. As an industrial center that accounted for fully 10% of Ukraine's GDP, Vilkul was convinced that Kryvyi Rih was a prime target for Russian forces.

In the third week of the war, Russian troops broadened their offensive across Ukraine and were again advancing toward Kryvyi Rih from the south. On 12 March, Metinvest was reported to have shuttered an open pit iron ore mine in the city, and to have sent the huge trucks used at the mine to block key roads to slow the Russian advance. In its 15 March briefing, the Ukrainian Ministry of Defence stated that the movement by "occupation troops" toward Kryvyi Rih had been stopped. According to Russian sources, the invaders faced extensive improvised fortifications and minefields. On 29 March, Vilkul said that the line of contact was no longer on the border with Dnipropetrovsk region, but 40-60 kilometers south in the Kherson Oblast. He was confident, in any case, that running 120 km north to south, the longest city in Europe could not be surrounded.

On 30 March, ArcelorMittal which at the beginning of the month had idled its steelmaking operations in Kryvyi Rih citing concern for the safety and security of its 26,000 workers and for its assets, announced that it was preparing to restart production.

At the end of May, responding to Russian rocket and missile strikes, Ukrainian forces made limited counterattacks south of Kryvyi Rih. The southern Inhulets and Radushne districts remain exposed to Russian shelling with civilian losses. At dawn on 25 August, Kryvyi Rih was hit by cluster munitions.

On 14 September, the city faced rising water levels in the Inhulets River, and water shortages, as the Russian forces fired eight cruise missiles at local infrastructure. The strike against President Zelenskyy's home town—an attempt, he suggested, to flood the city—came after his visit to towns in the Kharkiv region regained in Ukraine's first major counteroffensive.

Government

The city of Kryvyi Rih is governed by the Kryvyi Rih Municipality. It is a city community that is designated as a separate district within its oblast.

Administratively, the city is divided into "raions" (districts). Presently, there are 7 districts: Metallurgical, Central City, Terny, Saksahan, Inhulets, Pokrovskyi and Dovhintsivsky. Small townships, Avangard, Horniatske, Ternovaty Kut, Kolomoitsevo and Nowoivanivka were added to the city.

In 1775, Inhulets Povit (territory) of Novorossiysk Governorate was established on lands of Inhulets palanca after the abolition of the Zaporozhian Sich. In 1775/1776 it was part of Kherson Governorate. In 1783, the povit centre became Kryvyi Rih, and it was renamed "Kryvyi Rih Povit". In 1860 Kryvyi Rih got the status of township in Kherson Governorate. In 1919 township was granted city status in Yekaterinoslav Governorate and, later, Dnipropetrovsk Oblast. As a result of the administrative reform in 1923 Kryvyi Rih povit converted to Kryvyi Rih county, which in 1930 became an independent administrative
unit of Ukraine.

Kryvyi Rih has four single-mandate parliamentary constituencies entirely within the city, through which members of parliament (MPs) are elected to represent the city in Ukraine's national parliament. At the 2014 Ukrainian parliamentary election, they were won by Petro Poroshenko Bloc and independent candidates with representation being from Yuri Pavlov, Andriy Halchenko, Konstantin Usov respectively. In multimember districts the city voted for Opposition Bloc, a union of all political forces that did not endorse Euromaidan.  At the 2019 Ukrainian parliamentary election three local MPs were representing Servant of the People, the party of Ukrainian President and Kryvyi Rih native Volodymyr Zelenskyy, and one independent candidate, Dmytro Shpenov.

Culture

Kryvyi Rih has a thriving theatre, circus and dance scene, and is home to a number of large performance venues. There are also the Doll Theatre and Movement Theatre.
The first theater was the Coliseum, built in 1908. The New Theatre of Vyzenberh and Hrushevskyy followed in 1911, at the corner of Lenina and Kalynychenko streets. Kryvbas Theatre began its activities in 1931, and three years later was incorporated with the Shevchenko Theater. 
Kryvyi Rih is noted as the birthplace Eugenie Gershoy. She emigrated to the United States with her family in 1903, and there became an American sculptor and watercolorist. Gershoy's work is in the collections of the Whitney Museum of American Art, the Metropolitan Museum of Art, and the Smithsonian American Art Museum. Her papers are held at Syracuse University. Indie band Brunettes Shoot Blondes, folk musician Eduard Drach, actress Helena Makowska, and dancer Vladimir Malakhov also originated in the city.

The first film screenings were conducted in the city in the early 1920s. In 1934 Lenin Cinema was built. Today there are three movie theaters: Olympus, Odessa and Multiplex. The Kryvyi Rih Circus features large-scale exhibition space where fairs are held. A remnant of Soviet heritage are Palaces of Culture, located in every district of the city.

The local historical museum celebrates Cossack history, the industrial heritage of the area and its role in the Soviet State. The municipally owned Art Gallery houses a collection of local paintings.

The nightlife of the city has expanded significantly since the 2000s. Big clubs such as Hollywood and Sky have attracted touring DJs and pop and rap performers. Another major scene of the city is the Palace of Youth and Students of the Kryvyi Rih National University (KNU). The most popular fast-food, McDonald's, is located at 95th Block.

Ukrainian cuisine is found adjacent to a range of Jewish and popular American foods: bagels, cheesecake, hot dogs, shawarma and pizza. Japanese cuisine and other Asian restaurants, hookahs, sandwich joints, trattorias and coffeehouses have become ubiquitous. Other well-known places include City Pub and Prado Cafe. The city is home to the annual electronic music Turbofly festival. Rock music, a tradition in Ukraine, is an important part of the city's life and is hosted in few small pubs.

Education

Kryvyi Rih National University, a major institution, was originally formed as a college and Mining Institute in 1929.  It gained university status in 1982. Kryvyi Rih Pedagogical Institute was founded in 1930 as an Institute of Vocational Training, and is the oldest pedagogical institution in Kryvyi Rih, reorganized as a Pedagogical Institute. In 2011 the Cabinet of Ukraine founded Kryvyi Rih National University by uniting the Mining Institute, Pedagogical University, Economic Institute of Kyiv National Economic University and Department of the National Metallurgical Academy of Ukraine.

Other institutions include the local Department of Dnepropetrovsk State University of Internal Affairs, campuses of Zaporizhzhya National University, National University Odesa Law Academy and Interregional Academy of Personnel Management, college of National Aviation University.

In 2014 Donetsk Tugan-Baranovsky National University of Economics and Trade was evacuated to Kryvyi Rih after a start of the Russo-Ukrainian War. Its future is uncertain.

According to Frances Cairncross (in April 2010) "There are too many small universities, the majority of which are ineffectively governed and mired in corruption. They are not able to withstand existing global challenges." According to Anders Åslund (in October 2012) the quality of doctoral education is bad, particularly in management training, economics, law and languages. He also signaled that the greatest problem in the Ukrainian education system is corruption.

There are 149 general secondary schools and 150 nursery schools and kindergartens in Kryvyi Rih. Additionally, there are evening schools for adults, musical, art, sports and specialist technical schools.

Landmarks
Kryvyi Rih's buildings display a variety of architectural styles, ranging from eclecticism to contemporary architecture. The widespread use of red brick and block apartments characterize the city. Much of the architecture in the city was built during its prosperous days as a center for the ore trade. Just outside the immediate city center is a large number of former factories. Some have been totally destroyed; others are in desperate need of restoration.

Stalinist architecture was the predominant style of postwar apartments, of 5 to 7 stories. City Hall is the best example of The decree On liquidation of excesses. Khrushchyovka is a type of low-cost, concrete-paneled or brick three- to five-storied apartment building which was developed in the USSR during the early 1960s. It was named after Nikita Khrushchev, then premier of the Soviet government. Dozens of these aging buildings around the city are now past their design lifetime. There are six microdistricts.

The city has many Christian churches, the most notable being the Savior Transfiguration Cathedral of the Ukrainian Orthodox church. It is the base of the Kryvyi Rih Eparchy, which was established on July 27, 1996. A Roman Catholic chapel located in old town, Pokrova church, Mykhailivska church and Christmas church were destroyed in the 1930s during the Great Purge, never to be used as a church again.

In Kryvyi Rih, the Jewish community built a new, large synagogue, that opened in 2010.

Large parks hold many of Kryvyi Rih's public monuments. There are numerous socialist realism-style monuments installed in the Soviet years to honor Cossacks, Olexander Paul, Taras Shevchenko (2), Bohdan Khmelnytsky (3, since 1954), Vasili Marguelov, Alexander Pushkin, Fyodor Sergeyev, Mikhail Lermontov, and Maxim Gorky. The few Lenin monuments were destroyed during euromaidan events in 2014. Dozens of cenotaphs and memorials to Second World War soldiers were erected. A Sukhoi Su-15 is on display near the Aviator Club, Yakovlev Yak-40 at National Aviation University, Vyzvolennia Square holds a IS3 tank, and a Russian locomotive class Ye is placed near the Railway station.

Kryvyi Rih has few designated natural monuments: the old pear near Karnavatka, another pear of 1789, Vizyrka landscape reserve, Northern and Southern Red Beam, Amphibolite, Arkose and Skelevatski Outputs, Mopr Rocks, Slate rocks, Sandstone rock. A park named after the newspaper Pravda is very famous for its ampir boat station. Kryvyi Rih Botanical Gardens of the National Academy of Sciences of Ukraine (NAS) was established in 1980.

Sport

FC Hirnyk Kryvyi Rih is a football club based in Hirnyk Stadium, and currently competes in the Ukrainian First League. It is part of the Sports Club Hirnyk which combines several other sections. The club's owner is the Kryvyi Rih Iron Ore Combine (KZRK), the biggest subterranean mining public company in Ukraine.

Kryvyi Rih was also home to another football team, Kryvbas Kryvyi Rih. The team was founded as FC Kryvyi Rih in 1959. The next year it was part of the republican sports society Avanhard. After a couple of years, it changed to Hirnyk, before obtaining current its name in 1966. Kryvbas debuted in the Ukrainian Premier League in the 1992–93 season. They had been in the top league since their debut, with their best finish in third place in the 1998–99 and 1999–2000 seasons.

At the end of the  2012–13 season the team finished in 7th place. Due to financial difficulties the club declared itself bankrupt in June 2013.
FC Kryvbas-2 Kryvyi Rih was the reserve team of Kryvbas. In 1998 the club entered into the professional leagues to compete in the Second League. In 3 seasons the club moved to the Amateur Level before competing one last time in Second League.

SC Kryvbas is a professional basketball club. Achievements of the team are winning the Ukrainian Basketball League in 2009 and winning the Higher League in 2003 and 2004. Since 2010 the team is active in the Ukrainian Basketball SuperLeague.

The city is famous for its annual autorally. It was also the birthplace of the Ukrainian tennis players Valeria Bondarenko, Alona Bondarenko and Kateryna Bondarenko.

Geography

While the city is strikingly elongated on a map, in reality the greatest distance between two points within city limits is 66.1 km. The longer figures result from drawing a line precisely following the heavily indented city limits from north to south. Also, the city area is not contiguous, as part of the Inhulets District is an exclave to the city proper. There isn't a continuous built up area along the full length of the city. Kryvyi Rih's shape is influenced by the ore deposits which lie parallel to it and which have been the city's mainstay. The city centre is on the east bank of the Inhulets River, near its confluences with the River Saksahan.

The city is set in the rolling steppe land surrounded by fields of sunflowers and grain. A short distance east of the city center, there is an area along a small lake where glacial boulders were deposited. As a result, this area was never cultivated and contains one of the few remaining patches of wild steppe vegetation in the area. The city's environmental and construction safety is a growing problem due to abandoned mines and polluted ore-processing waste.

Climate
Kryvyi Rih experiences a dry warm hot-summer continental climate (Dfa) according to the Köppen climate classification system, like much of southern Ukraine. This tends to generate warm summers and cold winters with relatively low precipitation. Snowfalls are not common in the city, due to the urban warming effect. However, districts that surround the city receive more snow and roads leading out of the city can be closed due to snow.

Demographics

Historically, the population of Kryvyi Rih began to increase rapidly during the Interwar period, peaking at 197,000 in 1939. From then the population began to decrease rapidly. Foreign workers arrived, and there was increased building of social housing estates by the Kryvyi Rih City Council after the Second World War, such as Sotshorod and Sonyachny.

The 2014 estimate for the population of Kryvyi Rih was 654,900 (8th in Ukraine). This was a decrease of 4,348 since the 2013 estimate. Since 2001, the population has grown by 48,001. In 2013, deaths exceeded births by 3,589. The net migration rate is 234 (negative).

According to the UNHCR and City Council, 7,000 people have fled to Kryvyi Rih from Donetsk and Luhansk since the beginning of the Russo-Ukrainian War in 2014, not including those who did not register as asylum seekers.

Kryvyi Rih historically had a Christian majority-population. It has numerous churches, particularly in the city centre. The well-known Saviour Transfiguration Cathedral in Saksahan Raion is an Orthodox administrative centre, and the bishop of the Kryvyi Rih Eparchy has his main residence here. The town has a school of icon painting. The patron saint of the city is Saint Nicholas, as well as bishops Onufry and Porphyry.

This was long a centre of Jewish population. Its Central Synagogue was the tallest building in town in the late 19th century. The majority of the region's Jews live here, and a significant Jewish community has been re-established. Beis Shtern Shtulman Synagogue opened in 2010 in the city centre. In the early twentieth century, the city had two synagogues, located on Kaunas street. As part of the Roman Catholic Diocese of Kharkiv-Zaporizhia, the city has the Kostel of Mary Mother of Jesus. Kryvyi Rih is also home to Evangelical Christians, CEF, and Vedas communities.

In terms of ethnic composition, there are no official statistics. Jews have made up the single largest ethnic minority. Today they number 15,000, followed by Russians and Armenians.

Large immigrant groups include people from Korea, Poland, Moldova and Azerbaijan, as well as Assyrians and Roms. Numerous African students come to the city to attend local universities. Central city and Dovhuntsevskyi Raion are centres of population for ethnic minorities.

The Kryvyi Rih Metropolitan Region (KMR) had a population over 1,010,000 in 2010. In addition to Kryvyi Rih, the KMR (factually) includes far more than five raions, and numerous territories in central and southern parts of Ukraine. The KMR is the sixth-largest within Ukraine.

Economy
In 2020 Kryvyi Rih's share in Ukraine's national GDP was estimated to be about 7%. In mid-2014 Kryvyi Rih had an IPI of ₴41.6bn (about $3bn) with 17.9% growth. Export reached $2.520m (4.9% decrease), Import - $276m. City got $4.899m of foreign Investment, mainly from Germany, Cyprus, Netherlands, and the UK.

Average wage in September 2021 was ₴10.258 ($384). Official unemployment throughout 2018 averaged 0.95%.

Processing and mining industry - the two largest sectors of Kryvyi Rih. Rest fraction is about 50%.  City has over 53 plants, mines and factories. ArcelorMittal Kryvyi Rih, owned by ArcelorMittal since 2005 is the largest private company by revenue in Ukraine, producing over 7 million tonnes of crude steel, and mined over 17 million tonnes of iron ore. As of 2011, the company employed about 37 000 people. 4 Iron Ore Enrichment Works of Metinvest are a large contributors to the UA's balance of payments. Another giants of city are Evraz mining company and HeidelbergCement.

Transport

The publicly owned and operated Kryvyi Rih Metrotram is the fastest, the most convenient and affordable network that covers most, but not all, of the city. Despite its designation as a "metro tram" and its use of tram cars as rolling stock, the Kryvyi Rih Metrotram is a complete rapid transit system with enclosed stations and tracks separated both from roads and from the city's conventional tram lines.
City public transport serviced 66m persons in the first part of 2014.

On 1 May 2021 Kryvyi Rih became the first city in Ukraine to introduce free travel in public transport for its citizens. In order not to pay for municipal transport one must show a special electronic "Kryvyi Rih Card".

The historic tram system, once a well maintained and widely used method of transport, is now gradually being phased out in favor of buses and trolleybuses.

The taxi market is expansive but not regulated. In particular, the taxi fare per kilometer is not regulated. There is a fierce competition between private taxi companies.

Kryvyi Rih International Airport is the airport that serves the city. It is located 17.5 km (10.9 Miles) northwest of the city of Kryvyi Rih.

Notable people 

 Aliona Babak (born 1969) a Ukrainian politician, former Minister of Regional Development
 Ivan Bakanov (born 1975) politician, Head of the Security Service of Ukraine from 2019 to 2022
 Brunettes Shoot Blondes (formed 2010) a Ukrainian indie rock band 
 Olga Dibrova (born 1977) Ukraine's Ambassador to Finland
 Eduard Drach (born 1965) аn influential composer, singer-songwriter, kobzar and bandurist
 Petro Dyminskyi (born 1954) a Ukrainian businessman, politician
 EeOneGuy (born 1996) a Ukrainian YouTuber, Let's Player
 Andrey Filatov (born 1971) a Russian entrepreneur and chess enthusiast
 Eugenie Gershoy (1901–1986) an American sculptor and watercolorist
 Boris Glinka (1914–1967) & Dmitry Glinka (1917–1979) brothers, WWII Soviet flying aces
 Mari Kraimbrery (born 1992) a Russian singer
 Olena Kravets (born 1977) an actress, producer and TV host
 Pavlo Lazarenko (born 1953) Prime Minister of Ukraine in 1996–97
 Helena Makowska (1893–1964) a Polish actress in over 60 films between 1911 and 1958
 Vladimir Malakhov (born 1968) a ballet dancer and artistic director of the Berlin State Ballet from 2004 to 2014
 Serhii Nykyforov (born 1986) press secretary of the office of the Ukrainian president
 Zlata Ognevich (born 1986) a Ukrainian singer, Eurovision 2013 contestant
 Oleksandr Popov (born 1960) a Ukrainian politician and businessman
 Yuri Salko (born 1964) Ukrainian visual artist, works in painting, graphics and sculpture
 Serhiy Shefir (born 1964) Ukrainian politician, film director and Presidential assistant
 Zoia Skoropadenko (born 1978) a contemporary mixed-media artist, based in Monaco
 Hennadiy Udovenko (1931–2013) politician and diplomat, Minister of Foreign Affairs 1994-1998
 Oleksandr Vilkul (born 1974) statesman, Vice Prime Minister of Ukraine, 2012-2014
 Olena Zelenska (born 1978) architect and screenwriter, First Lady of Ukraine
 Volodymyr Zelenskyy (born 1978) politician and former comedic actor; 6th and current President of Ukraine since 2019

Sport 

 Daryna Apanashchenko (born 1986) a footballer with 128 caps for Ukraine women
 Alona Bondarenko (born 1984) a tennis player, doubles champion in 2008 Australian Open 
 Kateryna Bondarenko (born 1986) a tennis player, doubles champion in 2008 Australian Open
 Valeria Bondarenko (born 1982) a tennis player, won 8 doubles titles on the ITF Circuit 
 Sergey Fesenko Sr. (born 1959) 200m. swimmer, gold medallist at the 1980 Summer Olympics
 Sergei Makarenko (born 1937) a sprint canoeist and team gold medallist at the 1960 Summer Olympics
 Vladimir Maslachenko (1936–2010) a Soviet footballer (goalkeeper) and football commentator
 Serhiy Palkin (born 1974) football functionary, general director of FC Shakhtar Donetsk

Twin towns – sister cities

Kryvyi Rih is twinned with:
 Rustavi, Georgia
 Handan, China

Friendly cities
 Košice, Slovakia
 Lublin, Poland
 Miskolc, Hungary

See also
List of people from Kryvyi Rih

References

Footnotes

Bibliography

 Криворожье. Справочник-путеводитель / Днепропетровск: Днепропетровское книжное издательство, 1963. — 162 с. (in Russian)
 Кривому Рогу — 200. Историко-экономический очерк / Редколлегия: П. Л. Варгатюк и др. — Днепропетровск: «Промінь», 1975. — 208 с. (in Russian)
 Новик Л. И. Кривой Рог: Путеводитель-справочник / Л. И. Новик, Д. И. Кан. — Днепропетровск: «Промiнь», 1986. — 191 с., цв. ил. (in Russian)
 Пахомов А. Г., Борьба трудящихся Криворожья за власть Советов / А. Г. Пахомов. — Днепропетровск: Днепропетровское областное издательство, 1958. — 204 с. (in Russian)
 Альбом Кривой Рог-Гданцевка. 1899. (in German)
 Кривой Рог: Фотоальбом. — Киев: «Мистецтво», 1971. — 137 с., цв. ил. (in Ukrainian)
 Кривий Ріг: Фотоальбом. — Киев: «Мистецтво», 1976. — 146 с., цв. ил. (in Ukrainian)
 Кривий Ріг: Фотоальбом. — Киев: «Мистецтво», 1983. — 143 с., цв. ил. (in Ukrainian)
 Кривий Ріг: Фотоальбом. — Киев: «Мистецтво», 1989. — 144 с., цв. ил. (in Ukrainian)
 Кривий Ріг — моє місто / Тамара Трофанова. — Кривий Ріг: Видавничий дім, 2009. — [36] с.: фотогр. — 3500 (1 завод-1000) экз. — . (in Ukrainian)
 Кривий Ріг: фотоальбом / редкол.: Г. П. Гончарук (ред.) и др.; фотогр. А. Соловьёв. — Д.: АРТ-ПРЕСС, 2010. — 152 с.: фотогр. — на укр. и англ. языках. — 2200 экз. — . Посвящён 235-летию Кривого Рога. (in Ukrainian)
 Рукавицын И. А. Привет из Кривого Рога / И. А. Рукавицын. — К.: Арт-Технология, 2014. — 104 с.: ил. (русский язык)
 Визначні місця України / Київ: Держполітвидав УРСР, 1961. — 787 с. (in Ukrainian)
 Криворожский горнорудный институт. К 50-летию института / Коллектив авторов. — Издательство Львовского университета, 1972. — 184 с. (in Russian)
 Грушевой К. С. Тогда, в сорок первом… / К. С. Грушевой. — Москва, 1972. — 78 с. (in Russian)
 Мельник О. О., Криворіжжя: від визволення до перемоги. Хроніка подій з 22 лютого 1944 до 9 травня 1945 р / О. О. Мельник. — Кривий Ріг: Видавничий дім, 2004. — 56 с. (in Ukrainian)
 Советская историческая энциклопедия / Москва: «Советская энциклопедия», 1965. — Том 8, С. 150–151. (in Russian)
 Украинская советская энциклопедия. Том 5 (in Ukrainian), — С. 499–500. (in Russian)
 История Городов и Сёл Украинской ССР (в 26 томах). Том Днепропетровская область, — С. 285–323. (in Russian)
 Фокин Е. И. Хроника рядового разведчика. Фронтовая разведка в годы Великой Отечественной войны. 1943—1945 гг. / Е. И. Фокин. — М.: ЗАО «Центрполиграф», 2006. — 285 с. — (На линии фронта. Правда о войне). Тираж 6 000 экз. . (in Russian)
 Географический энциклопедический словарь. Географические названия. Издание второе, дополненное / Гл. ред. А. Ф. Трёшников. — Москва: «Советская энциклопедия», 1989. (in Russian)

External links
Kryvyi Rih administration website 

1kr City News 
Google Maps Satellite Image of Kryvyi Rih
Testing the mettle of Ukraine's steel city from the BBC World News 
The murder of the Jews of Kryvyi Rih during World War II, at Yad Vashem website.
Attack on Kryvyi Rih on July 9th

 
Populated places established in the 18th century
1775 establishments in Europe
Populated places established in the Russian Empire
18th-century establishments in Ukraine
Khersonsky Uyezd